Avraham "Avi" Tayari (born 25 October 1973) is a retired Israeli triple jumper. His personal best jump was 16.94 metres, achieved in May 1997 in Tel Aviv.

He competed at the 1992 World Junior Championships, the 1997 World Championships, the 1998 European Championships, the 2001 World Championships and the 2002 European Championships without reaching the final.

Achievements

See also
Sports in Israel

References

1973 births
Living people
Israeli male triple jumpers
Competitors at the 1999 Summer Universiade